Gee  is the phonetic pronunciation of the letter G.

Gee or GEE may also refer to:

Music 
 Gee Records, an American record label
 Gee (EP), a 2009 EP by Girls' Generation
 "Gee" (The Crows song), 1953
 "Gee" (Girls' Generation song), 2009

Places

Australia
 George Town Aerodrome, IATA airport code "GEE"

France 
 Gée, a commune

United States 
 Gee, Kentucky, an unincorporated community
 Gee, Oklahoma, a ghost town
 Gee Hill, a summit in Tennessee
 Gee Creek (Florida)
 Gee Creek (Washington)

Science and technology 
 Generalized estimating equation
 Gee (navigation) or GEE, a British radio navigation system used by the Royal Air Force during World War II
 Gee, a unit of g-force
  Google Earth Engine, a GIS cloud computing platform
 MIL-I-24768/2 type GEE, a PCB material

People 
 Gee (surname)
 Gee (nickname)
 Gee Tucker (born 1946), American actress

Other uses 
 Al Giardello, a fictional character on the television drama Homicide: Life on the Street

See also
 Gee v Pritchard, a landmark UK Chancery court judgment
 G (disambiguation)
 Gees, a village in the Netherlands
 Ghee (disambiguation)
 Gi (disambiguation)
 Ji (disambiguation)
 Jih (disambiguation)